The 2009–10 FC Karpaty Lviv season was the 47th season in club history.

Review and events

Competitions

Friendly matches

Pre-season

 Match stopped on 62nd minute after Volyn manager Vitaliy Kvartsyanyi ordered his team off the pitch protesting against a penalty

Mid-season

Winter break

Premier League

League table

Results summary

Matches

Ukrainian Cup

Squad information

Squad and statistics

Squad, appearances and goals

|-
|colspan="16"|Players away from the club on loan:

|-
|colspan="16"|Players featured for Karpaty but left before the end of the season:

|}

Goalscorers

Disciplinary record

Transfers

In

Out

Sources

Karpaty Lviv
FC Karpaty Lviv seasons